Burnet Cave (also known as Rocky Arroyo Cave of Wetmore) is an important archaeological and paleontological site located in Eddy County, New Mexico, United States within the Guadalupe Mountains about 26 miles west of Carlsbad.

Physical details

The cave has a southern exposure and is reported as being 21 m (70 feet) from the canyon floor. It has an elevation of 1402 m (4600 feet) according to Shultz and Howard (1935).

Archaeological finds
The cave originally had two walls. They were removed by locals several years before professional excavation began. The locals also dug several 3 foot deep holes and removed several baskets (one containing charred bones), fragments of netting, hide, sandals, and beads.

Excavation began in Burnet Cave under returning student E. B. Howard who was working under Alden Mason's Southwestern Expeditions sponsored by the University of Pennsylvania Museum of Anthropology and Archaeology.  The first southwestern trip was in 1929 and Bill Burnet showed them this cave on one of the first trips west.  The early field seasons at Burnet Cave were 1930, 1931, and 1932, and they went back again in 1936 and 1937 (Howard 1936:22, 1943b).  Additional survey work in the Guadalupe Mountains was done in 1934 as well but no new early sites were found (Howard 1935). Three cremated burials were found, with material, including a sper point, dating it to the Basket Maker (Ancestral Puebloans) culture.

The first Clovis point (termed Folsom-like by the excavator) found in the modern era was excavated in situ at Burnet Cave five feet, seven inches below ground surface (well below the burial level) on the edge of a hearth with burnt bison and musk-ox bones in August 1931(UPenn Museum catalog # 31-47-36) (Boldurian and Cotter 1999:73).  This find may predate the Dent Site, Clovis, and all others proposed as being the first in situ Clovis find in the Americas. Howard brought this projectile point to the 1931 Pecos Conference and showed it to several people, including Frank H H Roberts (discussed in Woodbury's Pecos history- 1983).

Until about 1950 Burnet Cave was considered to be among the handful of truly reliable intact Clovis sites but around that time it seems to have fallen out of favor because it was a cave, with an unusual Clovis faunule, that lacked the dramatic visions of the Mammoth-killing big game hunters myth then coming into vogue.

Burnet Cave was the first multi-component Paleoindian site excavated, though no additional.  The Clovis layer was four feet below the lowest layer containing Basketmaker material. The fine dirt was run through a ¼" screen at the front of the cave, something quite unusual for archaeological fieldwork at this time (Boldurian and Cotter 1999:7).  The poet Loren Eiseley was a member of Howard's crew and wrote scathingly about his experiences in the Guadalupe Mountains.

Paleontology finds

Aves: Aechmophorus occidentalis, Cathartes (C. aura Brodkorb),  Coragyps (C. atratus, C. occidentalis), Gymnogyps (G. californianus amplus), Accipiter (A. cooperi), Buteo swainsoni, Falco mexicanus Falco sparverius, Tympanuchus pallidicinctus, Oreortyx pictus, Meleagris gallopavo, Grus canadensis, Bubo virginianus, Asio flammeus, Colaptes auratus, Xanthocephalus xanthocephalus, Loxia curvirostra.
Aves (Extinct): Meleagris (M. crassipes)
Mammals: Antilocapra americana, Bassariscus astutus, Canis latrans, Canis lupus, Conepatus mesoleucus, Cynomys ludovicianus, Dipodomys (D. ordi), Felis concolor, Lemmiscus curtatus, Lepus(L. townsendii and L. alleni), Lynx rufus, Marmota flaviventris, Microtus (M. lonqicaudus, M. mexicanus, M. pennsylvanicus), Mustela nigripes, Navajoceros fricki, Neotoma cinerea (N. lepida or N. stephensi, N. mexicana), Odocoileus hemionus (O. virginianus), Ovis canadensis, Cratogeomys (C. castanops), Peromyscus maniculatus, Sorex, Spermophilus variegatus, Sylvilagus audubonii, (S. nuttallii), Taxidea taxus, Thomomys bottae (T. umbrinus), Vulpes velox (V. vulpes).
Mammals (Extinct): Arctodus sp., Bison antiquus, Camelops, Equus tau, E. francisci, Mexican Horse (E. conversidens), E. alaskae, Euceratherium collinum, Stockoceros onusrosagris
Reptilia: Phrynosoma douglasii (Rickart), Phrynosoma cornutum (Rickart), Crotaphytus collaris (Rickart), Sceloporus (Rickart).

See also
Cooper's Ferry site

References
Emslie, S. D. 1987. Age and diet of fossil California condors in Grand Canyon, Arizona. Science 237:768-770.
Harris, A. H. 1985. Late Pleistocene vertebrate paleoecology of the West. University of Texas Press, Austin, 293 pp.
Hester, J. J. 1960. Late Pleistocene extinction and radiocarbon dating. American Antiquity 26:58-77.
Howard, E. B. 1932. Caves along the slopes of the Guadalupe Mountains. Texas Archeological and Paleontological Society 4:7-20.
Howard, H. 1962. Bird remains from a prehistoric cave deposit in Grant County, New Mexico. Condor 64:241-242.
Howard, H. 1968. Limb measurements of the extinct vulture, Coragyps occidentalis. Pp. 115–128, in Collected papers in honor of Lyndon Lane Hargrave (A. H. Schroeder, ed.). Papers of the Archaeological Society of New Mexico 1.
Howard, H. 1974. Postcranial elements of the extinct condor Breagyps clarki (Miller). Contributions in Science, Natural History Museum of Los Angeles County 256:1-24.
Howard, H., and A. H. Miller. 1933. Bird remains from cave deposits in New Mexico. Condor 35:15-18.
Murray, Keith F., "Pleistocene Climate and the Fauna of Burnet Cave, New Mexico", Ecology, vol. 38, no. 1, pp. 129–32, 1957
Rea, A. M. 1980. Late Pleistocene and Holocene turkeys in the Southwest. Contributions in Science, Natural History Museum of Los Angeles County 330:209-224.
Rickart, E. A. 1977. Pleistocene lizards from Burnet and Dark Canyon caves, Guadalupe Mountain, New Mexico. Southwestern Naturalist 21:519-522.
Schultz, C. B., and E. B. Howard. 1935. The fauna of Burnet Cave, Guadalupe Mountains, New Mexico. Proceedings of the Academy of Natural Sciences of Philadelphia 87:273-298.
Schultz, C. B., L. D. Martin, and L. G. Tanner. 1970. Mammalian distribution in the Great Plains and adjacent areas from 14,000 to 9,000 years ago. AMQUA Abstract, 1st Meeting, 1970:119-120.
University of Texas - El Paso, Pleistocene Vertebrates of New Mexico and Trans-Pecos Texas
Wetmore, A. 1931. The California condor in New Mexico. Condor 33:76-77.
Wetmore, A. 1932. Additional records of birds from cavern deposits in New Mexico. Condor 34:141-142.

External links
 Burnet Cave: Evidence of Early Man in North America - Edgar B. Howard - The Museum Journal - vol. XXIV, no. 2-3, 1935
 Burnet Cave (Pleistocene of the United States), Paleontology Database

Clovis sites
Native American history of New Mexico
Archaeological sites in New Mexico
Pre-Columbian archaeological sites
Cenozoic paleontological sites of North America
Paleozoology
Caves of New Mexico
Landforms of Eddy County, New Mexico
Paleontology in New Mexico